The following lists events that happened during 1980 in the Grand Duchy of Luxembourg.

Incumbents

Events

January – March
 22 February – Minister Jean Wolter dies, and is replaced by Jean Spautz.

April – June
 19 April – Representing Luxembourg, Sophie & Magaly finish ninth in the Eurovision Song Contest 1980 with the song Papa Pingouin.
 1 May – In football, Luxembourg beats Thailand 1-0: Luxembourg's first international victory since 1973.
 9 May – The Luxembourgian national football team beats South Korea 3–2.  This was Luxembourg's last international victory until 1995.
 8 June – The Netherlands' Bert Oosterbosch wins the 1980 Tour de Luxembourg.

July – September
 1 July – Footballer Robby Langers transfers from Union Luxembourg to German club Borussia Mönchengladbach.

October – December
 21 November – Gaston Thorn is named as President of the European Commission.
 22 November – Gaston Thorn steps down as Deputy Prime Minister and Minister for Foreign Affairs of Luxembourg and is succeeded by Colette Flesch.  Camille Polfer replaces Flesch as Mayor of Luxembourg City.

Births
 15 April – Fränk Schleck, cyclist

Deaths
 22 February – Jean Wolter, politician
 27 June – Marcel Fischbach, politician
 12 July – Arsène Mersch, cyclist
 23 October – Auguste Trémont, artist

Footnotes

References